"Say Goodbye" is a song recorded by American singer Chris Brown. Released on August 8, 2006, from his self-titled debut album, the song is also featured in the movie Step Up. It became Brown's third top-ten single on the Billboard Hot 100, peaking at number ten on October 31, 2006, and the second single of his career to top the R&B charts. The track was released as a single in the UK and US. It was his first single to not chart at all in the UK.

Composition
The song is written in the key of B minor in common time with a tempo of 115 beats per minute.  Brown's vocals span from D4 to C6 in the song.

Music video
The song's music video (directed by Jessy Terrero) was released July 26, 2006. It features a short clip of the track "Ain't No Way (You Won't Love Me)" at the beginning of the music video. It follows Chris Brown trying to break up with his girlfriend. He also finds a new love interest by the end of the video.

Critical reception
While reviewing Step Up OST, Heather Phares of Allmusic called this song "wistful" and noted that it gets the film's romantic angle across without interrupting the flow of the more danceable tracks.

Charts

Weekly charts

Year-end charts

Certifications

References

Songs about parting
2005 songs
2006 singles
Chris Brown songs
Music videos directed by Jessy Terrero
Songs written by Bryan-Michael Cox
Songs written by Adonis Shropshire
Songs written by Kendrick Dean
Songs written for films
Contemporary R&B ballads
Pop ballads